Strancally Castle is a country house in County Waterford, Ireland. It is located on the River Blackwater, close to the town of Youghal in County Cork.

History
The original Strancally castle was built by Raymond le Gros. It was then reputedly occupied by Spaniards, who lured the local landowners to a banquet and then dropped them through a secret trapdoor into a flooded cave. When news of the murder hole leaked out the Spanish were routed and the castle destroyed.

The present building was designed and built around 1830 by James and George Richard Pain for John Keily, MP for Clonmel, and the High Sheriff of County Waterford for 1819–20. It stands in front of the ruin of the original Desmond castle. 

In 1856 the castle, in an estate of 5000 acres, was bought by 24-year-old George Whitelocke Lloyd of a wealthy Anglo-Irish manufacturing family. He was appointed High Sheriff of Waterford for 1859–60. His son William Whitelocke Lloyd was an army officer who fought in the Anglo-Zulu War of 1879 and was an accomplished artist.

The estate eventually came into the possession of the Irish Land Commission, who sold off the land piecemeal before selling the house with a remaining 160 acres.

In 2022 the estate owners, Gianni and Michael Alen-Buckley, were reported by their domestic and maintenance workers to the Workplace Relations Commission. The Spanish anarcho-syndicalist confederation CNT-AIT, and other sections of the International Workers’ Association (IWA-AIT), showed their solidarity with the workers, and notified the company of the initiation of a union dispute and the organization of a range of solidarity actions.   The Irish-based Organise! workers association also showed its public support for the workers’ demands.

References

Castles in County Waterford
Historic Houses in County Waterford
1830 establishments in Ireland